Mbugwe may refer to:
the Mbugwe people
the Mbugwe language